Concise railway station is a railway station in the municipality of Concise, in the Swiss canton of Vaud. It is an intermediate stop on the standard gauge Jura Foot line of Swiss Federal Railways.

Services
The following services stop at Concise:

References

External links 
 
 

Railway stations in the canton of Vaud
Swiss Federal Railways stations